Gdańsk Politechnika railway station is a railway station serving the city of Gdańsk, in the Pomeranian Voivodeship, Poland. The station opened in 1952 and is located on the Gdańsk Śródmieście–Rumia railway. The train services are operated by SKM Tricity.

Its name is derived from Gdańsk University of Technology (pl: Politechnika Gdańska) which is nearby. The station was known as Gdańsk Nowa Szkocja (en.: Gdańsk Nova Scotia) until the 1960s.

Gdańsk Politechnika is connected with Gdańsk Nowe Szkoty, which was on the route to Gdańsk Nowy Port. This line has been closed to passenger services since June 2005.

Train services
The station is served by the following services:

Szybka Kolej Miejska services (SKM) (Lębork -) Wejherowo - Reda - Rumia - Gdynia - Sopot - Gdansk

References

 This article is based upon a translation of the Polish language version as of November 2016.

External links

Railway stations in Poland opened in 1952
Railway stations served by Szybka Kolej Miejska (Tricity)
Politechnika